"Sister Sadie" is a jazz standard written in 1959 by Horace Silver, and first recorded for his 1959 Blue Note Records album Blowin' the Blues Away. In 1961, Silver commented on Hank Crawford's version presented on the album More Soul: "They did this a little faster than I intended, but then that's their interpretation – the way they hear it [...] it's more of a blues-band-type interpretation".

Covers
1960: Hank Crawford – More Soul (Atlantic Records)
1960: Gil Evans – Out of the Cool (Impulse!)
1961: Andy and the Bey Sisters – Andy and the Bey Sisters (RCA Victor)
1961: Ray Charles – Genius + Soul = Jazz (Impulse!)
1961: Shirley Scott – Shirley Scott Plays Horace Silver (Prestige) 
1961: James Moody – Cookin' the Blues (Argo) 
1963: Woody Herman – Woody Herman–1963 (Philips Records)
1966: Buddy Rich – Swingin' New Big Band (Pacific Jazz)
1975: Ray Charles – My Kind of Jazz Part 3 (Crossover Records)
1975: Rahsaan Roland Kirk – Dog Years in the Fourth Ring (released 1997) (32 Jazz)
1991: Maceo Parker – Mo' Roots
1992: Joe Pass – In Hamburg (ACT Music)
1992: Joey DeFrancesco – Reboppin′
1992: GRP All-Star Big Band – GRP All-Star Big Band
1993: Dee Dee Bridgewater – Keeping Tradition
1993: GRP All-Star Big Band – Dave Grusin Presents GRP All-Star Big Band Live!

References

See also
List of post-1950 jazz standards

1950s jazz standards
Compositions by Horace Silver